The Delmar Loop, often referred to by St. Louis residents simply as The Loop, is an entertainment, cultural and restaurant district in University City, Missouri and the adjoining western edge of St. Louis near Washington University in St. Louis and Forest Park. Many of its attractions are located in the streetcar suburb of University City, but the area is expanding eastward into the Skinker DeBaliviere neighborhood of the City of St. Louis. In 2007, the American Planning Association named the Delmar Loop "One of the 10 Great Streets in America."

Origin and overview
The area gets its name from a streetcar turnaround, or "loop", formerly located in the area. 

Delmar Boulevard was originally known as Morgan Street. According to Norbury L. Wayman in his circa 1980 series History of St. Louis Neighborhoods, the name Delmar was coined when two early landowners living on opposite sides of the road, one from Delaware and one from Maryland, combined the names of their home states. The town of Delmar, Delaware, on the border between the two states, derived its name in similar fashion.

The Delmar Loop station, a stop on the MetroLink Red Line, is located at the eastern end of the area.

The western demarcation of the Loop is generally considered to be the U. City Lions,  sculptures of a male lion and a female lion on pedestals flanking Delmar immediately west of the University City City Hall.  West of the lions, Delmar becomes largely residential.  The eastern boundary of the Loop traditionally was the St. Louis City border, punctuated by The Delmar Lounge at the corner of Delmar and Eastgate, but the area began expanding into the city proper around 2000. This expansion has largely been due to the redevelopment efforts of Joe and Linda Edwards, owners of Blueberry Hill, The Pageant, and Pin-Up Bowl, and the Tivoli Theater, the Moonrise Hotel, and Eclipse Restaurant.  The St. Louis Regional Arts Commission completed its new headquarters on Delmar in 2003, creating performance and office spaces for theater groups.  The Pageant, located across Delmar from the Arts Commission, has become one of St. Louis's main venues for mid-size popular musical performances, featuring rap, rock, and country artists, including St. Louisans Chuck Berry and Nelly.

The Loop attracts an eclectic clientele and wide variety of street life, due in part to its proximity to Washington University and dating back to the late 1960s when Streetside Records and head shops dominated the retail landscape.

Attractions and institutions

Major Loop institutions include:
The Pageant music venue
Riverfront Times newspaper
Tivoli Theater
University City City Hall
University City Public Library
Blueberry Hill pub and restaurant
Fitz's Restaurant and Bottling Company

Some companies, such as Answers.com and Integrity have their headquarters in the Delmar Loop.

Other establishments on the Loop include the 560 Music Center (owned by Washington University in St. Louis), COCA Center for Creative Arts, Craft Alliance Center of Art + Design, Moonrise Hotel, Subterranean Books, and Vintage Vinyl record store.

The Loop is also home to many local restaurants including Al-Tarboush deli, Peacock Loop Diner, Blueprint Coffee, Cicero's Italian Restaurant (closed in 2017), Corner 17 Chinese Restaurant, Gokul Indian Restaurant, Gyro House, Meshuggah Cafe, Mission Taco, Three Kings Public House, Seoul Taco Korean Tacos, Piccione Pastry, Ranoush Mediterranean Cuisine, Snarf's Sandwiches, T-N-T Wieners, and four Thai restaurants owned by Pat's Thai Restaurants.

St. Louis Walk of Fame

The Loop is the home of the St. Louis Walk of Fame, a series of brass plaques embedded in the sidewalk along Delmar Boulevard commemorating famous St. Louisans, including musicians Chuck Berry, Miles Davis and Tina Turner, actor John Goodman, bridge-builder James Eads and sexologists Masters and Johnson.

Trolley

The Loop Trolley is a 2.2-mile fixed-track heritage trolley line in the Loop, that links the area with MetroLink and Forest Park attractions, a project that received a $24.9 million grant from the Federal Transit Administration. The trolley officially began service on November 16, 2018, in the city of St. Louis and one week later on its University City section in the Loop. The trolley was shut down in December 2019 amid financial problems, but reopened in August 2022.

History
During the 1950s, the Loop was the meeting place for U. City's teenagers. The Varsity Theater and the Tivoli showed first-run movies. Ed's Billiards which was located between the two theaters was always full of teenagers. There were restaurants up and down the Loop area. Enright Avenue, which was part of the streetcar turnaround, had a drug store and three restaurants plus a record store. There was another drug store on the corner of Delmar and Kingsland. Both drugstores had soda fountains. Delmar at Skinker wasn't considered part of the Loop but had a Garaveli's Restaurant and a well known nightclub Davy "Nose" Bold's across from it.

The video for the song "Air Force Ones", by rapper Nelly was filmed in the Delmar Loop. Nelly's hit "Country Grammar (Hot Shit)", references the Loop extensively.

See also
Streetcars in St. Louis

References

External links 
 Delmar Loop home page
 A blog/critique of certain aspects of the Loop, with photos
 Loop Trolley home page

Culture of Greater St. Louis
Culture of St. Louis
Economy of St. Louis
Entertainment districts in the United States
Neighborhoods in St. Louis
Restaurant districts and streets in the United States
Streets in St. Louis
Transportation in St. Louis County, Missouri
Shopping districts and streets in the United States
Tourist attractions in St. Louis
Tourist attractions in St. Louis County, Missouri